International Community School (ICS) is a private secondary school in Kotagiri, Tamil Nadu, India. It is a co-educational, residential school. Founded by renowned educationist, Jerry Lacson, International Community School was initially called Kotagiri Community School (KCS). Heather Lacson, Jerry's wife took over the reins of the school after his passing on in 2007 until management of the 4-decade year old institution was taken over by social entrepreneur Senthil Rangaraj and his wife Maheswari Rangaraj since 2015. They are assisted by a team of senior educationists. ICS is a co-educational, residential cum day school following the ICSE syllabus.

References

External links 
 Official website
 http://www.internationalcommunityschool.org/

Private schools in Tamil Nadu
Boarding schools in Tamil Nadu
High schools and secondary schools in Tamil Nadu
Schools in Nilgiris district
Educational institutions established in 1974